Sprucin' Up is a 1935 Our Gang short comedy film directed by Gus Meins.  It was the 137th Our Gang short that was released.

Plot
Hoping to get on the good side of the new truant officer (Dick Elliott), the gang goes out of their way to impress the man's cute daughter (Marianne Edwards), even unto making such sacrifices as taking baths, combing hair, shining shoes, and washing behind the ears.

Both Spanky and Alfalfa pay a social call on Marianne, and before long, the two lifelong pals have become romantic rivals. Ultimately, Spanky and Alfalfa stage an athletic competition to determine who is the better man, an undertaking with prickly results.

Note
Sprucin' Up was originally going to be known as Good Night Ladies.

According to The Lucky Corner Web Site, the boys can be identified in the scene where they are sitting on the curb, from left to right as:  Harold Switzer, Robert Lenz, Alvin Buckelew, Scotty Beckett, George "Spanky" McFarland, Billie "Buckwheat" Thomas, Carl "Alfalfa" Switzer, and Donald Proffitt.

Cast

The Gang
 George McFarland as Spanky
 Carl Switzer as Alfalfa
 Scotty Beckett as Scotty
 Billie Thomas as Buckwheat
 Alvin Buckelew as Alvin
 Donald Proffitt as Our Gang member
 Robert Lentz as Our Gang member
 Harold Switzer as Harold
 Pete the Pup as himself

Additional cast
 Marianne Edwards as Miss Jones, the new girl
 Jerry Tucker as Percy
 Harry Bernard as Officer Riley
 James P. Burtis as Real estate agent
 Dick Elliott as Mr. Jones, father
 Bess Flowers as Scotty's mother
 Leota Lorraine as Spanky's mother
 Lillian Rich as Mrs. Jones, mother
 Gertrude Sutton as Alfalfa's mother
 Viola Richard as Second pedestrian
 Lester Dorr as First pedestrian
 Billy Bletcher as Scotty's father (scenes deleted)
 Blanche Payson as Scotty's mother (scenes deleted)

See also
 Our Gang filmography

References

External links

1935 films
American black-and-white films
1935 comedy films
Films directed by Gus Meins
Hal Roach Studios short films
Our Gang films
1935 short films
1930s American films